Xanthomonas hortorum is a plant pathogen which causes bacterial leafspot and headrot in lettuce.

External links
Type strain of Xanthomonas hortorum at BacDive -  the Bacterial Diversity Metadatabase

Xanthomonadales